Thalab, whose kunya was Abū al-Abbās Aḥmad ibn Yaḥyā (815 – 904) was a renowned authority on grammar, a muhaddith (traditionist), a reciter of poetry, and first scholar of the school of al-Kūfah, and later at Baghdād.  He was a keen rival of Al-Mubarrad, the head of the school of al-Baṣrah. Thalab supplied much biographic detail about his contemporary philologists found in the biographical dictionaries produced by later biographers.

Life
Abū al-Abbās Thalab was born in Baghdād and Ibn al-Karāb in his Tarīkh ('History') gives his date of birth as October 815 [third month, 200 AH], others give 816 or 819 [201 AH or 204 AH]. Thalab recalled seeing, as a child of four years, the caliph al-Mamūn arriving back to the city from Khurāsān in 819/20 (204 AH). The Caliph processed from the Iron gate towards the Palace of al-Ruṣāfah, and the crowds were lined up as far as al-Muṣalla. Thalab remembered clearly the occasion when the caliph raised him up from his father's arms and said, 'This is al-Mamūn.'

Thalab was adopted by the military-leader-come-poet Man ibn Zāidah, of the Banū Shaybān, and became a grammarian, philologist, and traditionist of the Kūfah school.

Thalab recalled his interest in Arabic studies, poetry, and language had begun in 831 (216 AH) at age sixteen and that he had memorised to the letter all of al-Farrās works, including Al-Hudūd, by the age of twenty-five.  His primary focus was on grammar, poetry, rhetoric, and Al-Nawadir (Strange Forms). He associated with, and counselled, Ibn al-Arābī for about ten years.

Thalab describes an occasion being at the home of Aḥmad ibn Saīd with a group of scholars, amongst whom were al-Sukkarī and Abū al-Āliyah.  Critiquing the meaning of a poem by al-Shammākh, Ibn al-A'rābī and Aḥmad ibn Saīd showed surprise at Thalab's confidence.

In another anecdote, related by Abū Bakr Aḥmad ibn Mūsā ibn Mujāhid al-Mukri,  Thalab once expressed concern for his soul as a disciple of Abū Zayd Said ibn Aws al-Anṣārī (d.830) and Abū Amr ibn al-Alā (d.770), over the exegetes, traditionists and fuqaha (jurists).  However Ibn Mujahid then told him of his dream wherein the Prophet had sent a message to Thalab that his was the superior science.  Abū Abd Allāh al-Rūdbāri interpreted this to mean that the study of oral language is above all the other sciences – tafsir (exegesis), Ḥadīth (tradition), fiqh (Law) – as it perfects and connects these to discourse.

Thalab, was invited but declined to take a commission by the vizier al-Qāsim to write a commentary on the book Compendium of Speech by Maḥbarah al-Nadīm, which the caliph Al-Mutaḍid had ordered.  He offered instead to work on the Kitāb al-Ayn of al-Khalīl, and the commission went to Al-Zajjaj.

On 30 March or 6 April 904 (17 or 10 Jumada al-Awwal 291 AH), being quite deaf, he was knocked down by a horse while walking in the street and died the next day.  He was buried in the vicinity of his house near the Damascus Gate in Baghdād.

Thalab's teachers

Ibn al-Arābī
Al-Zubayr ibn Bakkār (d.870)
Aḥmad ibn Ibrāhīm, Abū al-Ḥasan, a calligrapher grammarian, not an author.

Works
Among his books there were:
Kitāb al-Muṣūn fī al-Nahw wa-Jaalah Hudūdān What is "Precious" (Preserved) in Grammar, which he wrote in the form of definitions (ḥudūd);
Kitāb Ikhtilāf al-al-Naḥwīyīn Points on which grammarians disagree;
Kitāb Maʻānī al-Qurʼān The Meaning of the Qurān;
Kitāb al-Muwaffaqa Mukhtaṣir fī al-Nahw The Favoured, an abridgment of grammar;
Kitāb mā yulaḥan fīhī al-Āmma Faulty Expressions in popular use;
Kitāb al-Qirāāt Differences between the Seven Readings of the Qurān;
Kitāb Maʻānī al-Šir Rare ideas in ancient Arabic poetry;
Kitāb al-Taṣgīr Diminutive Nouns;
Kitāb mā Yanṣarif wa mā lā Yanṣaruf  What Is Declined and What Is Not Declined; Parts of Speech which form or do not form other functions;
Kitāb mā Yujzā wa mā lā Yujzā What Is Grammatical and What Is Not Grammatical; Nouns of first declension;
Kitāb al-Šawādd Exceptions;
Kitāb al-Amthāl Similes; Collection of Proverbs;
Kitāb al-Aiman wa al-Dawahā Oaths and Calamities;
Kitāb al-Waqf wa al-Ibtidā Start and End of Phrases;
Kitāb al-Istikhraj al-Alfāz min al-Akhbār The Derivation of Expressions from Legends (Historical Traditions);
Kitāb al-Hijā Spelling;
Kitāb al-Awsat Ra'aītah Grammar of medium extent;
Kitāb Ghuraīb al-Qurān Laṭīf The Excellent Book of the Strange in the Qurān;
Kitāb al-Masāil Questions discussed;
Kitāb ḥadd al-Nahw Definitions of Grammar;
Kitāb Tafsīr Kalām Ibnat al-Khusa Exposition of the Statement of Ibnat al-Khus [Hind];
Kitāb al-Faṣīḥ Eloquent Style (the Pure), on philology; 
Kitāb al-Tafsīr al-Qurān Parsing the Qurān; 
Kitāb al-Qirāāt li-Thalab Al-Qirāah of Thalab (Qurānic Readings);

Legacy
Thalab is cited as a source for biographies of the following
Grammarians of Baṣrah - Yūnus ibn Ḥabīb, Sībawayh Abū Ubaydah, al-Aṣmaī, Al-Athram, 
Grammarians of Kufa - al-Ruāsī, Al-Zajjāj  who wrote the commentary of the Compendium of Speech.

Thalab's disciples
Abū al-Abbās Thalab dictated his discourses on grammar, language, historical traditions, the tafsir (Qurānic exegesis), and poetry to his pupils who transmitted his works. Among these were:

Pupils
Ibn Miqsam; a grammarian and Qurānic reader who wrote The Sessions of Thalab. 
Al-Akhfash al-Asghar (d.927)
Ibn Durustūyah (ca.871 -958) wrote The Middle Ground between Thalab and al-Akhfash al-Mujāshiī, about the meaning of the Qurān, and Refutation of Thalab, concerning Thalab's book “Disagreement of Grammarians”.  
Abū Bakr ibn al-Anbārī  (885 - 940) learned grammar from Abū al-'Abbās Thalab 
Hārūn Ibn al-Ḥāik, a Jew from al-Ḥīrah was an outstanding student of grammatical studies at al-Kūfah and was a pupil of Thalab. 
Abū Muḥammad Abd Allāh al-Shamī (the Syrian) a member of the school of al- Kūfah who wrote Collected Questions. 
Abū Umar al-Zāhid al-Mutarriz, or al-Zāhid The Ascetic, who was nicknamed "Ghulām Thalab" (870 - 957), wrote a commentary on Thalab's Kitāb al-Faṣīḥ.  
 Al-Ḥāmiḍ  was a scholar of al-Baṣrah, a scribe, and close friend of Thalab. 
Nafṭuwayh (ca.858 - 935) learned from Thalab and al-Mubarrad, Muḥammad ibn al-Jahm (d. 895), Ubayd Allāh ibn Isḥāq ibn Salām, and the associates of al-Madāinī (753 - 846). 
Abū Abd Allāh al-Yazīdī (d. 922) preceptor to Caliph Al-Muqtadir

Poets edited by Thalab
al-Ashā 
Al-Nābighatān
Ṭufayl
Al-Ṭirimmāḥ, etc.

Further reading

 

; worldcat.org.

Notes

References

Citations

Bibliography

; p. 648
; IV, 127-8; VI, 146-51; IX, 154-62; XIV, 85-8.
 

815 births
904 deaths
9th-century people from the Abbasid Caliphate
9th-century lexicographers
9th-century philologists
9th-century scholars
9th-century scientists
9th-century writers
Scholars from the Abbasid Caliphate
Arab lexicographers
Arabists
Grammarians of Kufa
Hanbalis
Iraqi lexicographers
Iraqi scholars
Lexicographers of Arabic
Medieval grammarians of Arabic
Medieval linguists